Silvio Ilinković (born 5 October 2002) is a Bosnian professional footballer who plays as a midfielder for Bosnian Premier League club Zrinjski Mostar.

References

External links

2002 births
Living people
People from Travnik
Bosnia and Herzegovina footballers
Bosnia and Herzegovina under-21 international footballers
HŠK Zrinjski Mostar players
Croatian Football League players
First Football League (Croatia) players
Premier League of Bosnia and Herzegovina players
Bosnia and Herzegovina expatriate footballers
Expatriate footballers in Croatia
Bosnia and Herzegovina expatriate sportspeople in Croatia